Bloody Saturday may refer to:
 Bloody Saturday (1919), climax of the Winnipeg general strike
 Bloody Saturday (photograph), a photograph of a Chinese baby amid the ruins of Shanghai's South Station after Japanese bombing attacks in 1937
 1981 Brixton riot, an anti-police riot by black youths in London

See also
 Black Saturday (disambiguation)